The Jonathan Wade House is a historic First Period house at 13 Bradlee Road in Medford, Massachusetts.  It is one of a handful of houses in the city with brickwork from the 17th century (the other two known survivors are the Isaac Royall House and the Peter Tufts House).  A brick house is known to have been standing on this site in 1689, when Jonathan Wade, Jr., died.  The house was given Georgian styling in the mid-18th century, and was owned for many years in the 19th century by Samuel C. Lawrence, Medford's first mayor.

The house was listed on the National Register of Historic Places in 1975.

See also
List of the oldest buildings in Massachusetts
National Register of Historic Places listings in Medford, Massachusetts
National Register of Historic Places listings in Middlesex County, Massachusetts

References

Houses completed in 1683
Houses on the National Register of Historic Places in Medford, Massachusetts
Houses in Medford, Massachusetts
1683 establishments in Massachusetts